X.Vision (Persian ایکس.ویژن) is an Iranian consumer electronics manufacturer and a subsidiary of Maadiran Group.

Regional markets
X.Visions' market is focused on the Middle East, primarily Iran. The company launched its products in a highly publicized campaign in April 2005, where the Iranian distribution company Maadiran Group became responsible for all aspects of the X-Vision brand in Iran.

External links
 Maadiran Group (Iran distributor)

Electronics companies of Iran
Companies established in 2005
2005 establishments in Iran